is a Japanese ice hockey player. He competed in the men's tournaments at the 1960 Winter Olympics and the 1964 Winter Olympics.

References

1935 births
Living people
Japanese ice hockey players
Olympic ice hockey players of Japan
Ice hockey players at the 1960 Winter Olympics
Ice hockey players at the 1964 Winter Olympics
Sportspeople from Iwate Prefecture